The Beijing U7 or previously the Senova D70 is a mid-size sedan produced by BAIC under the Senova sub-brand and later the Beijing sub-brand respectively. The model range was originally the Beijing Auto Shenbao D-Series, and renamed to Senova D70 after the launch of the Senova brand. The second generation model added an additional Chinese name, Zhidao, at launch, and was later renamed to Beijing U7 after the launch of the revamped Beijing brand.

First Generation (2013–2017)

The Senova D70 was formerly known as the Beijing Auto Shenbao D-Series which came in two trim levels, the Shenbao D280 and the Shenbao D320. It was previewed by the Beijing Auto C70G prototype. The Shenbao D-Series was based on the Saab 9-5 and it debuted on the 2013 Shanghai Auto Show and was launched on the Chinese car market on May 11, 2013. Pricing ranges from 165,800 yuan to 235,800 yuan. The Beijing Auto Senova D-Series was renamed to Beijing Auto Senova D70 in 2014, bringing the name in line with the rest of the range and repositioning the car under the Senova brand with an updated price range from 139,800 yuan to 215,800 yuan. The Senova D70 is powered by a range of engine options including a 1.8 liter turbo engine producing 177hp, a 2.0 liter turbo engine producing 204hp, and a 2.3 liter turbo engine producing 250hp, all mated to a five-speed automatic transmission.

Senova D80
The Senova D80 debuted during the 2014 Guangzhou Auto Show as the flagship executive car of the Senova brand, it is the stretched and premium variant of the Senova D70 (D-Series). The Senova D80 is powered by the same engines as the D70 including a 1.8 liter turbo engine producing 177hp, a 2.0 liter turbo engine producing 204hp, and a 2.3 liter turbo engine producing 250hp. Production started in April 2015 and ended in 2017. In comparison to the D70, the D80 is 85mm longer, 40mm wider and 21mm higher. It also has an extra 75mm wheelbase. Before its official launch, a luxury sedan concept designed by Italian studio Fioravanti called the C90L, was shown in 2012 Auto China. The D80 is said to be a production version of this concept.

Second Generation (2018–present)

The second generation Senova D70 was unveiled in October 2018 with the Chinese name "Zhidao" (智道), and featuring the new "Offspace" design language. 

As of 2019, the D70 is renamed as Beijing U7 in order to be in line with the range of the new Beijing brand. The Zhidao or Beijing U7 is powered by two different 1.5 liter turbo engines producing 110kW and 120kW respectively and a maximum torque of 210N·m for the 110kW engine. Engines are mated to a CVT gearbox and a 6-speed automatic gearbox.

As of 2020, the second generation model was later renamed to Beijing U7 after the launch of the revamped Beijing brand.

Beijing EU7
In September 2019, BAIC Group launched sales of the all-electric sedan called the Beijing EU7 in China. The Beijing EU7 is a mid-size electric sedan based on the Beijing U7 or previously the Senova Zhidao (D70/U7).

The electric executive EU7 is powered by an electric motor rated at 218 hp (163 kW) and connected to a bottom-mounted traction battery. BAIC claims the EU7 has 450 kilometers (280 miles) of NEDC-rated range. 

Technology features of the EU7 include multilink spring-based suspension for extra comfort in long journeys, climate control system, panoramic roof, a 12-inch multimedia display, a digital dashboard, and a 360-degree car camera system. The Beijing EU7 starts from 160,000 Chinese Yuan on its domestic market (~22,500 USD) with the state subsidies applied.

References 

D70
Front-wheel-drive vehicles
Sedans
Cars introduced in 2013
Cars of China
Production electric cars